Maybe Tomorrow is the tenth solo album by former White Lion and Freak of Nature lead singer Mike Tramp, released on February 24, 2017, through Mighty Music/Target Records.

Background and recording 
Maybe Tomorrow follows on from Tramp's recent trilogy of albums: Cobblestone Street, Museum and 2015's Nomad.

The album was recorded at Medley studio, Copenhagen with Soren Andersen behind the knobs and on guitar. This is Tramp's sixth consecutive studio album working with Andersen. Known as the 'Band of Brothers' the album also features Morten Hellborn on drums, Jesper Haugaard on bass, and Morten Buchholtz on Hammond organ and piano, making it the same line-up as Nomad.

Release and promotion 
In January 2017, Tramp launched a music video for the first single "Coming Home", which was filmed and edited by Kennie Østed. In February 2017, the song "Would I Lie to You" was released as the second single from the album  followed by the third single "Spring" released in May 2017. In 2018 "Rust and Dust" was also released as a single.

Tramp toured Europe to support Maybe Tomorrow.

Mike Tramp has topped the Danish album sales charts (certified by IFPI), debuted at number one on the vinyl chart and number two on the physical albums chart.

Track listing

Personnel 
 Mike Tramp – vocals, acoustic guitar
 Søren Andersen – guitar, piano
 Morten Hellborn – drums
 Jesper Haugaard – bass
 Morten Buchholz – keyboards

Touring
 Claus Langeskov – bass
 Kenny Andy – drums

Charts

References 

2017 albums
Mike Tramp albums